The 1915–16 Illinois Fighting Illini men's basketball team represented the University of Illinois.

Regular season
The 1915–16 season was a follow up to an undefeated season, in which the Fighting Illini men's basketball team won both a national and  Big Ten Conference championship.  Coached by Ralph Jones, the Illini continued their winning ways by finishing the season with an overall record of 13 wins and 3 losses and a 9 win 3 loss conference mark.  Taking second in the Western Conference to the National Champion Wisconsin Badgers men's basketball team.  During the season, the Illini dropped two games to Northwestern and one to eventual champion Wisconsin, but the first loss to the Wildcats was the Illini’s first-ever overtime game as Northwestern scored two points in the overtime period to beat Illinois, 23-21, February 12, 1916, at what is now the Kenney Gym Annex.  The starting lineup included Gordon Otto, Dan W. Elwell and Ralf Woods rotating at the forward position, center C. G. Alwood, and guards Clarence Applegran and captain Ray Woods.  Woods was named an All-American for his work during this season.  Woods and Alwood were named All-Big Ten players for the season.

Roster

Source

Schedule
												
Source																

|-	
!colspan=12 style="background:#DF4E38; color:white;"| Non-Conference regular season
|- align="center" bgcolor=""

			

|-	
!colspan=9 style="background:#DF4E38; color:#FFFFFF;"|Big Ten regular season	

Bold Italic connotes conference game

Player stats

Awards and honors
Ray Woods was elected to the "Illini Men's Basketball All-Century Team" in 2004. Woods was also selected as an All-American for the 1915–16 season.

References

Illinois Fighting Illini
Illinois Fighting Illini men's basketball seasons
1915 in sports in Illinois
1916 in sports in Illinois